Aeginidae is a family of hydrozoans in the order Narcomedusae. The family comprises 6 genera and 8 species.

Taxonomy
The following genera are recognized in the family Aeginidae:
 Aegina  Eschscholtz, 1829 (2 species)
Aeginona  Lindsay, 2017 (monotypic – Aeginona brunnea)
Aeginura  Haeckel, 1879 (2 species)
Bathykorus  Raskoff, 2010 (monotypic – Bathykorus bouilloni)
Jubanyella  Fuentes & Pages, 2006 (monotypic – Jubanyella plemmyris) 
Otoporpa  Xu & Zhang, 1978 (monotypic –  Otoporpa polystriata)

Description
Hydrozoans with dome-shaped bells and tentacles set above the undulating margin of the bell. There are gastric pouches containing the gonads situated between the tentacles, the number of pouches being greater than the number of tentacles. The pouches extend below the points of origin of the primary tentacles. Some genera have a peripheral canal system and others do not, and some have secondary tentacles.

References

 
Narcomedusae
Cnidarian families